Liv Kjersti Bergman (born Liv Kjersti Eikeland; 20 March 1979 in Bergen) is a former Norwegian biathlete. She debuted in the World Cup in 1999 in Oberhof. Her best position so far is a second on the 15 km from Östersund in 2006. She participated in the World Championship 2005 in Hochfilzen where she achieved a 16th place in the 15 km and was a part of the Norwegian team who came in fifth.

References

External links
 

1979 births
Living people
Norwegian female biathletes
Olympic biathletes of Norway
Biathletes at the 2010 Winter Olympics
Sportspeople from Bergen
21st-century Norwegian women